Pandwa is one of the administrative community development block of Palamu district, Jharkhand state, India. The Pandwa block has 8,985 households with aggregate population of 46,957. The block has 8 panchayats and about 34 villages.

History 

Pandwa a Taluka/Block, close to Medininager Palamu, is located 18 km from Medininagar(Daltonganj). Pandwa is a part of Chhatarpur  (Vidhan Sabha constituency). Pandwa is located in north of Daltonganj. It is well connected by NH 98.

Pandwa mod is one of the main landmark in this place. This is one of the junction point of Palamu district. One junction goes towards Manahar and Lamipatra. second  junction goes towards Aurangabad, Bihar through Amba and Hariharganj. Third junction goes towards Garwa towards NH75. It is well covered by Vodafone, Airtel, Uninor, Reliance, BSNL, Aircel, Idea, Airtel 3G, like cellular networks. ATM facility is also available here for SBI near Pandwa Branch.

Administration

Panchayats 

Pandwa mandal/Block consists of 8 Panchayats. The following are the list of Panchayats in the Block:

Chhechauri
Majhigawan
Patra
Murma
Pandwa
Lohra
Garikhas
Kajri

Villages

There are about 34 villages in Pandwa block, which you can browse from villages list below.

Ahori
Barwadih
Basu
Batsara
Bhusra
Buchi Lami
Chakrudarpur
Chhechhauri
Chilhi
Derwa
Dulhi
Dumri
Gareriadih
Gari Khas
Golhana
Jhari
Kajarma
Kajri
Kathautia
Kokarsa
Lami
Lohandi
Lohanra
Majhiganw
Manahar
Murma
Pandwa
Patra
Rabdi
Sakhua
Sakhui
Saraiya
Sarma
Sika

Languages 

Languages spoken here include Asuri, an Austroasiatic language spoken by approximately 17,000 in India, largely in the southern part of Palamu; and Bhojpuri, a tongue in the Bihari language group with almost 40 000 000 speakers, written in both the Devanagari and Kaithi scripts.

Facilities

Education 
 2 RK High School-(R.K High School Lami Patra & R.K High School Lohara)
 RK middle school

Market 

A small market called as  Pandwa bazaar is situated in middle of the block which 1 km away from Pandwa block administrative building.Common shops like kirana, general store, saloon, cloth shop, fashion stores, jewelry stores, medicine stores etc. exists here in huge number.

Police Station 

A police station is situated at the heart of Pandwa block. This police station is one of the important police station in Palamu district.

Bank 

Two Banks are situated nearby Pandwa Bazaar. They are State Bank of India (SBIN0009494) and Palamu kshetriya Gramin Bank. SBI Bank has 24 hr ATM facility.

See also
 Chhatarpur Assembly
 Palamu Loksabha constituency
 Jharkhand Legislative Assembly
 Jharkhand
 Palamu

References

External links 
 Blocks of Palamu district
 Details of Pandwa block
 Details of villages under Pandwa block

Community development blocks in Jharkhand
Community development blocks in Palamu district